Wankendorf was an Amt ("collective municipality") in the district of Plön, in Schleswig-Holstein, Germany. The seat of the Amt was in Wankendorf. In January 2008, it was merged with the Amt Bokhorst to form the Amt Bokhorst-Wankendorf.

The Amt Wankendorf consisted of the following municipalities:
Belau 
Ruhwinkel 
Stolpe 
Wankendorf

Former Ämter in Schleswig-Holstein